Laxapana Falls is  high and the 8th highest waterfall in Sri Lanka and 625th highest waterfall in the world. It is formed by Maskeliya Oya near the confluence of Kehelgamu Oya and Maskeliya Oya which forms Kelani River. The falls gives its name to twin hydroelectric power stations, Old Laxapana Power Station which generates 50 MW of electricity and New Laxapana Power Station which generates 100 MW.

Folklore
Popular folklore tells this the place where Buddha mended his saffron robe when he was visiting Sri Pada. The name of the Falls derived from Sinhala words of "Laxa" means Hundred thousand and "Pahana" or "Pashana" means rock.

See also 
 List of waterfalls in Sri Lanka

References 

Waterfalls of Sri Lanka
Waterfalls in Central Province, Sri Lanka